Federal Highway 26 (Fed. 26) is a toll-free part of the federal highway corridors.

References

026